= Sociedad Española de Alquiler Garantizado =

Spanish Society of Guaranteed Rental

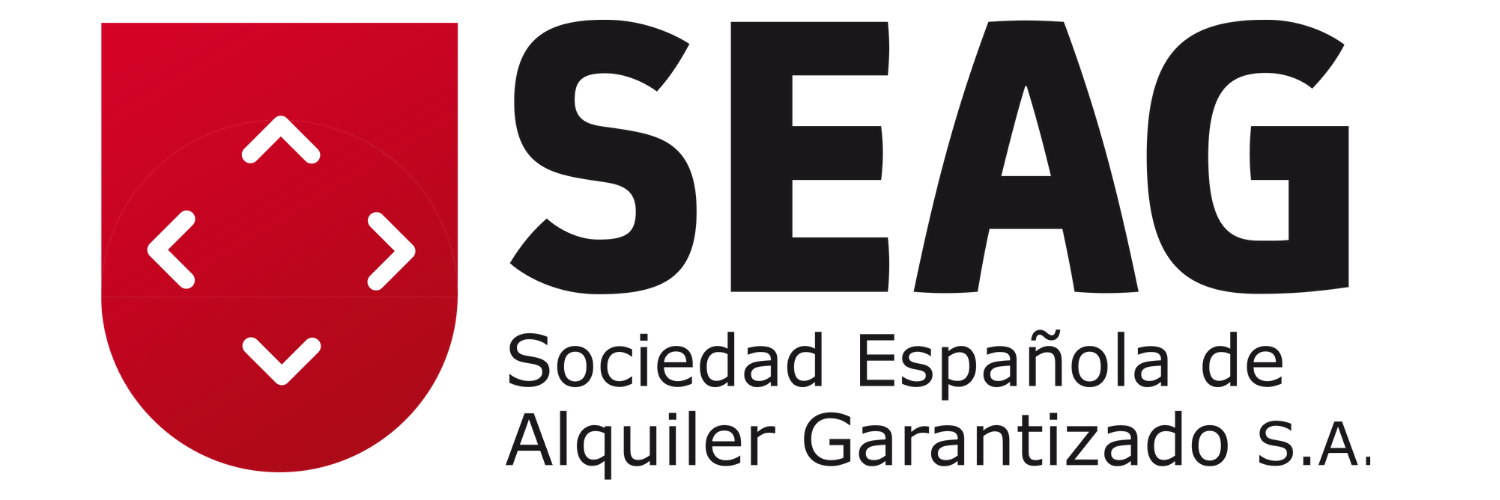
- Founded: 2014
- Type: Professional organization
- Location: Barcelona
- Region served: Spain
- Website: www.seag.es

Sociedad Española de Alquiler Garantizado (SEAG, in English: Spanish Society of Guaranteed Rental) is a company founded in 2014 that advises property owners in Spain in cases of non-payment, squatting, or damage to rented properties.

SEAG specializes in guaranteeing indefinite rent payment in the event of tenant default; in providing legal protection against rental arrears and other lease-related disputes; and in offering legal advice and representation in eviction proceedings. The company collaborates with real estate agencies and property managers.

In May 2025, following a study by the Federación Nacional de Asociaciones Inmobiliarias (FAI) (National Federation of Real Estate Associations) and SEAG, it was confirmed that the supply of long-term rentals fell by more than 50% after the Housing Law came into force. In addition, 35% of property owners took out rent default guarantees as a reflection of the growing legal uncertainty in the sector.
